The Miami Vice Squad was an indoor football team.  They are a 2007 expansion member of the National Indoor Football League.  They played their home games at the BankUnited Center in Coral Gables, Florida. Florida Division suspended in early 2007.

Season-By-Season 

|-
|2007 || 1 || 0 || 0 || 2nd Atlantic Florida || --

External links
Official Website

National Indoor Football League teams
American football teams in Miami
American football teams in Florida
Coral Gables, Florida
American football teams established in 2006
American football teams disestablished in 2007
2006 establishments in Florida
2007 disestablishments in Florida